Big Piney Creek is a river located in Ozark National Forest in the state of Arkansas. It is a tributary of the Arkansas River and therefore part of the Mississippi River watershed. Managed by the United States Forest Service, it flows for  through Pope, Johnson and Newton counties. The headwaters of the creek are in a rugged, remote area just east of Arkansas Route 21 south of the community of Fallsville and the mouth of the creek empties into Lake Dardanelle on the Arkansas River.

The creek is known among kayakers and canoers for its moderately challenging Class II to Class III rapids. Although much of the land adjacent to the creek is privately owned, the Forest Service operates two campgrounds, Haw Creek Falls and Long Pool, for visitors.

Big Piney Creek Bridge 

The Big Piney Creek Bridge is a historic bridge, carrying Arkansas Highway 123 across Big Piney Creek in the Ozark-St. Francis National Forest, northeast of Hagarville, Arkansas. The bridge was listed on the National Register of Historic Places in 1990.

See also
List of Arkansas rivers

References

Rivers of Arkansas
Tributaries of the Arkansas River
Rivers of Pope County, Arkansas
Rivers of Johnson County, Arkansas
Bodies of water of Newton County, Arkansas
Wild and Scenic Rivers of the United States